Tirzah  (variant "Thirza") is a biblical name, one of the daughters of Zelophehad, and subsequently the name of a biblical city.

Hebrew name
Tirzah is first mentioned in the Torah as one of the five daughters of Zelophehad. After the death of their father, the five sisters went to Moses and asked him for hereditary rights. Moses brought their plea to God, and it was granted. To this day, women in Judaism have the right to inherit property, though only when there are no male heirs with an equally close relationship to the deceased.
Tirzah is mentioned as a town in  Song of Solomon 6:4 Thou art beautiful, O my love, as Tirzah, comely as Jerusalem, terrible as an army with banners.

Tirzah in literature
Tirzah is a figure in William Blake's mythology, notably in his poem To Tirzah from Songs of Experience. According to Northrop Frye, Blake identified both the Biblical city of Tirzah and the daughter of Zelophehad with worldliness and materialism, as opposed to the spiritual realm of Jerusalem in Judah. The name Tirzah has a similar symbolism in Lew Wallace's novel Ben-Hur: A Tale of the Christ, in which it is given to the leprosy-afflicted sister of Judah Ben-Hur, who is eventually cleansed by Jesus. The character of Tirzah, played by Cathy O'Donnell, appears in William Wyler's 1959 film Ben-Hur, which won the Academy Award for Best Picture. Tirzah is also the main character in Sara Douglass's novel Threshold. Tirzah is one of the names used to refer to the character "Angel" in Francine Rivers's book Redeeming Love. In "Giants in the Earth," by Esther Friesner in Turn the Other Chick (Chicks in Chainmail series), Tirzah is a concubine of King David who becomes one of the series' titular sword-wielding "chicks." In Agatha Christie's murder mystery The Pale Horse, one of the three women who claim to be witches is named Thyrza Grey.

References

Ancient Israel and Judah
Women in the Hebrew Bible
Book of Numbers people